Íslandsmót kvenna í íshokkí (English: Icelandic Women's Hockey League), also known as Hertz deild kvenna for sponsorship reasons, is an ice hockey league in Iceland. Its current champion is SA Ásynjur. It is run by Ice Hockey Iceland.

League Champions
 2000–2001 – SA Ásynjur
 2001–2002 – SA Ásynjur
 2002–2003 – SA Ásynjur
 2003–2004 – SA Ásynjur
 2004–2005 – SA Ásynjur
 2005–2006 – Björninn
 2006–2007 – SA Ásynjur
 2007–2008 – SA Ásynjur
 2008–2009 – SA Ásynjur
 2009–2010 – SA Ásynjur
 2010–2011 – SA Ásynjur
 2011–2012 – SA Ásynjur
 2012–2013 – SA Ásynjur
 2013–2014 – SA Ásynjur
 2014–2015 – SA Ásynjur
 2015–2016 – SA Ásynjur
 2016–2017 – SA Ynjur
 2017–2018 – SA Ásynjur
 2018–2019 – SA Ásynjur
 2019–2020 – SA Ásynjur
 2020–2021 – SA Ásynjur
 2021–2022 – SA Ásynjur

Titles by team

See also
Icelandic Men's Hockey League

References

External links 
Icelandic Hockey League

Women's ice hockey leagues in Europe